Richard Napier Luce, Baron Luce,  (born 14 October 1936) is a British politician. He is a former Lord Chamberlain to the Queen, serving from 2000 to 2006, and has been Governor of Gibraltar, a Conservative Member of Parliament (MP) from 1971 to 1992, and government minister, and a crossbench member of the House of Lords.

Early career
Born in Westminster, Luce was educated at Wellington College and Christ's College, Cambridge. He completed national service in Cyprus 1955–1957, serving as a second lieutenant with the Wiltshire Regiment. His service number was 449150. He then briefly joined the Overseas Civil Service, first as a district officer in Kenya, 1960–1962. He then worked for Gallaher Ltd as a brand manager (1963–1965), before becoming marketing manager for the Spirella Company of Great Britain. In 1968–1971 he was director of the National Innovation Centre.

From 1972 to 1979, he was chairman of IFA Consultants Ltd, he was also chair of Selenex Ltd (1973–1979), and of Courtenay Stewart International (1975–1979).

Political career
After unsuccessfully contesting Hitchin against Labour's Shirley Williams in 1970, Luce was first elected to the House of Commons as Member of Parliament (MP) for Arundel and Shoreham in a by-election in 1971.  When that constituency was abolished in boundary changes for the February 1974 general election, he was returned for the new Shoreham constituency.  He retired from the Commons at the 1992 general election.

Luce was appointed the parliamentary private secretary to the Minister of Trade and Consumer Affairs in 1972.  After the Conservative Party lost the February 1974 general election, he became an opposition whip.

When the Conservatives returned to power at the 1979 general election, he became Parliamentary Under-Secretary of State for Foreign Affairs for the Foreign and Commonwealth Office. In 1981, he was promoted to Minister of State for Foreign Affairs within the same department. In 1982, he followed his Secretary of State, Lord Carrington, in resigning over Argentina's invasion of the Falkland Islands. He returned to office in 1983, again as a minister of state in the Foreign and Commonwealth Office. In 1985, he was moved to the Privy Council Office as Minister for the Arts and Minister for the Civil Service, which was his last ministerial office. He resigned in 1990.

Luce was made a privy counsellor in 1986 and knighted in 1991.

Later life
Luce was Vice-Chancellor of the University of Buckingham between 1992 and 1996. In 1997, he was appointed Governor of Gibraltar, an office he held until 2000, and he was created a life peer, on 2 October 2000 as Baron Luce, of Adur in the County of West Sussex. He sat in the House of Lords until his retirement on 29 June 2020.

In 2000, Luce was appointed a Knight Grand Cross of the Royal Victorian Order (GCVO) and became Lord Chamberlain, head of the Queen's Royal Household. He relinquished the post of Lord Chamberlain on 11 October 2006 and was succeeded by the Rt Hon. The Earl Peel.

Luce was appointed a Knight Companion of the Order of the Garter (KG) on 23 April 2008.

On 26 April 2012, Luce was appointed by David Cameron, the Prime Minister, as the chair of the Crown Nominations Commission for the see of Canterbury, the commission set up to nominate the 105th Archbishop of Canterbury.

Luce is president of the Voluntary Arts Network, and is High Steward of Westminster Abbey. He was president of the Royal Over-Seas League from 2002 until May 2020.

Luce was appointed as the first Chancellor of the University of Gibraltar upon its foundation in 2015.

In popular culture
Lord Luce was portrayed by Jonathan Coy in the 2002 BBC production of Ian Curteis's controversial The Falklands Play. He has written Ringing the Changes, A Memoir published by Michael Russell.

Family

He is the son of Margaret (née Napier) and Sir William Luce, Governor and Commander-in-Chief of Aden, Political Resident in the Gulf and Special Representative to the Foreign Secretary (Lord Home) for Gulf Affairs. His father's older brother was Admiral Sir David Luce, First Sea Lord (1963–1966). His maternal grandfather was Vice Admiral Sir Trevylyan Napier, who was the Commander-in-Chief, America and West Indies Station (1919–1920). 

Luce has two sons, Alexander and Edward. His sister Diana is married to retired Royal Navy officer, Captain David Hart Dyke, and his niece is comedian and actress Miranda Hart. His paternal grandfather, Rear admiral John Luce, survived two key British naval battles during World War I: the defeat at the Battle of Coronel and the victory at the Battle of the Falkland Islands.

Arms

Honours

Commonwealth honours
 Commonwealth honours

Scholastic

 Chancellor, visitor, governor, rector and fellowships

Honorary degrees

Memberships and fellowships

References

External links
 

1936 births
Living people
Military personnel from London
Alumni of Christ's College, Cambridge
People educated at Wellington College, Berkshire
People associated with the University of Buckingham
Conservative Party (UK) MPs for English constituencies
Members of the Privy Council of the United Kingdom
Crossbench life peers
Knights Bachelor
Knights of the Garter
Knights Grand Cross of the Royal Victorian Order

UK MPs 1970–1974
UK MPs 1974
UK MPs 1974–1979
UK MPs 1979–1983
UK MPs 1983–1987
UK MPs 1987–1992
Deputy Lieutenants of West Sussex
Governors of Gibraltar
Politicians awarded knighthoods
Wiltshire Regiment officers
Life peers created by Elizabeth II